Ctenucha affinis is a moth of the family Erebidae. It was described by Herbert Druce in 1884. It is found in Guatemala.

References

affinis
Moths described in 1884